Al Hurricane Jr. (born Alberto Nelson Sanchez Jr. on October 30, 1959) is an American singer-songwriter. He is known as "The Godfather’s Son" and "The Godson" of New Mexico music, a nickname which was inherited from his father Al Hurricane, who is considered "The Godfather" of New Mexico music. He has long been his father's protégé, he has created numerous solo albums, and has contributed songs such as "Flor De Las Flores" to New Mexico's unique style of Spanish music.

Biography
"Al Hurricane Jr." was born Alberto Nelson Sanchez Jr. to Alberto Nelson Sanchez and Nettie M. Fleming on October 30, 1959, in Albuquerque, New Mexico. He began performing music at the age of five, and performed the song Love Potion #9 during his first performance at the Albuquerque Civic Auditorium.

References

External links
 
 Official Al Hurricane Jr playlist on YouTube by Atlantis CDs
 

1959 births
Living people
American male singer-songwriters
American rock guitarists
American rock musicians
American rockabilly musicians
American rock singers
American rock songwriters
American country guitarists
American country singer-songwriters
American folk guitarists
American male guitarists
American folk singers
American performers of Latin music
American musicians of Mexican descent
American ranchera singers
Rock en Español musicians
Songwriters from New Mexico
Singers from New Mexico
New Mexico music artists
Spanish-language singers of the United States
Guitarists from New Mexico
20th-century American guitarists
20th-century American male musicians
21st-century American keyboardists
21st-century American male musicians
Hispanic and Latino American musicians